Agnes Mathilde Wergeland (May 8, 1857 – March 6, 1914) was a Norwegian-American historian, poet and educator. Agnes Mathilde Wergeland was the first woman ever to earn a doctoral degree in Norway.

Early life and education
Agnes Mathilde Wergeland was born in Christiania (now Oslo), Norway to Sverre Nicolai Wergeland (1817–96) and Anne Margrethe Larsen (1817–89). She was from a prominent, distinguished Norwegian family. Wergeland's family hailed from Brekke in Sogn. Her brother was Norwegian painter, Oscar Wergeland. She was the great-niece of Norwegian writer and politician, Nicolai Wergeland; hence Henrik Wergeland, Camilla Collett and Joseph Frantz Oscar Wergeland were the cousins of her father.

She attended Nissen Girls School in Christiania in 1879, studied independently Norwegian history, Greek and Roman architecture and sculpture, and medieval history at the University Library of Christiania from 1879 until 1883. Then she studied Old Norse and Icelandic law under jurist Konrad von Maurer at the University of Munich from 1883 to 1885. She then attended the University of Zurich, whence she took her PhD in 1890. Wergeland emigrated to America because there were few opportunities for women in higher education in Norway.

Career

She received a fellowship in history from Bryn Mawr College in 1890 and lectured there for two years before lecturing at the University of Illinois in 1893. She was a docent in history and nonresident instructor at the University of Chicago from 1896 to 1902.  In 1902,  Wergeland was offered the position of chair of the department of history at the University of Wyoming.

Agnes Mathilde Wergeland wrote several scholarly works, three of which were published after her death.  She also wrote two volumes of poetry which were published by Symra in Norwegian: Amerika, og andre digte (1912) and Efterladte digte ( 1914 ).

Wergeland lived with Grace Raymond Hebard, and Grace's sister, Alice, in the home she built with Hebard in Laramie, known to students and colleagues as "The Doctors Inn". Wergeland died in 1914. Grace's sister, Alice Marvin Hebard, died in 1928, and Hebard in 1938.

Agnes Wergeland remained a University of Wyoming history professor until her death. Before she died at age 57, she testified her book collection to the library of the University of Wyoming. She is buried alongside Grace Raymond Hebard at Greenhill Cemetery, Laramie, Albany County, Wyoming.

Legacy
An endowment fund was given as a memorial to the University of Oslo for Norwegian women students to study history and economics in the United States. A scholarship in history was also established by professor Grace Raymond Hebard to honor her friend and colleague, Agnes Wergeland, as one of the pioneering members of the History Department to the University of Wyoming.

In 1916, Maren Michelet wrote a biography Glimt fra Agnes Mathilde Wergelands liv.  She also wrote an English language translation,  Glimpses from Agnes Mathilde Wergeland's life. Both editions were published by Folkebladet Publishing Company which  Sven Oftedal had organized in 1877 in order to promote Norwegian language publications in the United States.

Agnes Mathilde Wergeland Lodge  of the Daughters of Norway was organized in Junction City, OR on October 2, 2011.

Agnes Wergeland is honored, together with Elise Wærenskjold, at the Western Norway Emigration Center at Radøy in Hordaland, Norway  as one of two Norwegian-American women writers who helped bring the news of life in America to Norwegians.

Selected works
Modern Danish Literature and its Foremost Representative (1895)
Ameriká og Andre Digte (1912) Norwegian
Efterladte Digte (1914) Norwegian
History of the Working Classes in France  (1916)
Leaders in Norway and Other Essays  (1916)
Slavery in Germanic Society During the Middle Ages (1916)

References

Primary Source
Michelet, Maren  (1916) Glimpses from Agnes Mathilde Wergeland's life (Kessinger Publishing Company. 2004. translation of Glimt fra Agnes Mathilde Wergelands liv)
Løken, Lise B. (1995) Dr. Agnes Mathilde Wergeland : historian, poet, and American university professor (University of Oslo)
 Fekjær, Kari-Anne  (2007) Three Norwegian immigrant women in their pioneer settlements in the early trans-Mississippi West (University of Oslo)

Related Reading
Riley, Glenda  (1989) The Female Frontier: A Comparative View of Women on the Prairie and the Plains (University Press of Kansas)
Øverland, Orm (1996) The Western Home: A Literary History of Norwegian America (Norwegian-American Historical Association. Northfield, MN)
Scanlon,  Jennifer and Shaaron Cosner  (1996) American Women Historians, 1700s-1990s: A Biographical Dictionary  (Greenwood Press. Westport, Conn)

External links
Først over målstreken. Agnes Wergeland var Norges første kvinne med doktorgrad. Hun ble en fagpioner både i Norge og USA
Agnes Mathilde Wergeland Lodge #52 Junction City, Oregon. Daughters of Norway
 The family tree of Agnes Mathilde Wergeland on Geni.com

1857 births
1914 deaths
Writers from Oslo
Norwegian expatriates in Germany
Norwegian expatriates in Switzerland
University of Zurich alumni
Norwegian emigrants to the United States
People from Laramie, Wyoming
Writers from Wyoming
Bryn Mawr College faculty
University of Illinois faculty
University of Chicago faculty
University of Wyoming faculty
19th-century American historians
American Lutherans
American women historians
20th-century American historians
20th-century American women writers
19th-century American women writers
19th-century Lutherans